The Pennsylvania Polka refers to a series of moves affecting the Philadelphia Eagles and Pittsburgh Steelers franchises in the National Football League (NFL) from 1940 to 1941.

Art Rooney, the owner of the Pittsburgh Steelers, sold his team to Alexis Thompson on December 10, 1940, and subsequently bought a 50% stake in the Philadelphia Eagles franchise from owner Bert Bell. At the time of the deals, a mini-draft took place between the two teams, using a pool of players from both rosters. This resulted in the Eagles acquiring seven players formerly of the Steelers, and the Steelers obtaining eleven players formerly of the Eagles. The 1941 NFL Draft was also held during this time.

Rooney later had second thoughts on the transactions, and made an agreement to swap cities with new Steelers owner Thompson on April 3, 1941. This resulted in the Philadelphia Eagles moving their team to Pittsburgh and becoming the new Pittsburgh Steelers, and the Pittsburgh Steelers moving their team to Philadelphia and becoming the new Philadelphia Eagles.  Since NFL franchises at the time were territorial rights distinct from individual corporate entities, the Eagles and Steelers are each officially acknowledged by the NFL as single unbroken entities since 1933, especially since all of these events took place during the offseason. However, the players on the Eagles were basically traded to the Steelers in exchange for their players (with the exception of players who changed teams during the mini-draft, in which case those players "stayed" on the same teams). All players drafted by the Philadelphia Eagles in the 1941 NFL Draft therefore had their rights held by the Pittsburgh Steelers after the final swap, and vice versa.

Background

Both the Philadelphia Eagles and Pittsburgh Pirates franchises were founded in 1933, after blue laws in Pennsylvania were rescinded to allow organized sports teams to play on Sundays. Bert Bell and Lud Wray founded the Eagles, and Art Rooney founded the Pirates. The Pirates became the Pittsburgh Steelers in 1940.

Wray coached the Eagles in their first three years from 1933–1935, with no winning seasons, compiling a 9–21–1 record. In that time period, the partners exhausted $85,000 (presently, $), and at a public auction in 1936, Bell became sole owner of the Eagles with a bid of $4,500 (presently, $). Austerity measures forced him to supplant Wray as head coach of the Eagles, but Bell also did not produce a winning season, finishing the 1940 season with a 1–10 record and a 10–44–2 overall career coaching record.

By 1940, the Steelers were on their fifth head coach in eight years. Like the Eagles, the Steelers had not posted a winning record in their franchise's history. Before the 1940 season, Rooney said if the Steelers had another losing season he would be compelled to sell the team. The team started the season at 1–0–2 before falling at home by a score of 10–3 to a Brooklyn Dodgers squad coached by local hero Jock Sutherland. He had assumed the head job for the Dodgers that year after spurning a similar offer from Pittsburgh. The loss to the Dodgers began a six-game losing streak, before the team traded wins with the Eagles to cap a 2–7–2 season in which they scored a total of just 60 points. Over eight years, the team had compiled a record of 24–62–5 and had lost around $100,000 ($ million today). Rooney was also concerned about the availability of players in the coming seasons due to the ongoing war in Europe and the specter of a military draft.

Initial sales
After turning down several earlier offers to relocate or sell the team, in December 1940, Rooney sold the Steelers to Alexis Thompson. Thompson was a 26-year-old, Yale-educated heir to a steel fortune and an entrepreneur living in New York.

Thompson originally sought to buy the Eagles from Bell in November 1940, but Bell connected him with Rooney to make an offer on the Steelers. The Steelers hired Bell to negotiate the sale and promised him a 20% cut of the sale price if it sold within 30 days. The purchase price was reported to be $160,000 ($ million today). This price was less than the $225,000 ($ million today) the Detroit Lions had previously sold for, but the Lions had won an NFL championship. Bell earned $32,000 from the sale. The transaction was completed and announced on the same day that the Chicago Bears pummeled the Washington Redskins by a score of 73–0 in the most lopsided NFL championship game of all time.

Rooney immediately took $50,000 from the sale and invested it in a 50% interest in the Philadelphia Eagles franchise, which was owned by his friend Bell, and became vice president of the franchise's board of directors.

Mini-draft
In an unusual twist Rooney, Bell, and Thompson pooled the rosters of the two squads and conducted essentially a mini-draft to distribute the talent. The 51 players which were signed to the Steelers and Eagles at the end of the 1940 season were shuffled between the two teams. In this transaction, the Rooney/Bell team added eleven players from the  Steelers: ends George Platukis, Walt Kichefski and John Klumb; tackles Clark Goff and Ted Doyle; guards Carl Nery and Jack Sanders; and backs Boyd Brumbaugh, John Noppenberg, George Kiick and Rocco Pirro. In exchange, Thompson's team gained seven players: ends Joe Carter and Herschel Ramsey, tackles Phil Ragazzo and Clem Woltman, guard Ted Schmitt, and backs Joe Bukant and Foster Watkins, all of whom had played for Bell's 1940 Eagles the prior year.

Thompson hired Greasy Neale, whom Rooney had pursued to coach the Pirates in 1933, to conduct this player swap as well as to assist him with the draft which took place the day after the deal with Rooney was finalized. Once he was released from his contract with Yale, Neale became head coach of Thompson's team to replace Kiesling. In January 1941, Thompson renamed his new squad the Iron Men.

Re-swap
Despite the fact he now was half-owner of a team based in Philadelphia, Rooney had no intention of leaving Pittsburgh. It was thought that Thompson preferred to move his new team to be nearer his New York home, perhaps to Boston, which had been without an NFL team since the Redskins relocated to Washington in 1937. If Thompson had moved the team away from Pittsburgh, Rooney and Bell hatched a plan that would have seen their team split its home games between the two Pennsylvania cities and rename their squad the Keystoners. However, the other league owners blocked both moves.

By early 1941, Rooney was beginning to regret his decision to sell the Pittsburgh team. When he saw that Thompson had not yet established a local office for his team, as he had announced he would do by March 1, Rooney made an offer. He and Bell would trade territories with Thompson. This would put Thompson in Philadelphia, which was much closer to his New York base. It would also ensure that Rooney's team would stay in his hometown. On April 3, 1941, Thompson accepted the deal and Rooney and Bell's Eagles went to Pittsburgh, where they became the Pittsburgh Steelers, while Thompson's Iron Men moved to Philadelphia, where they took on the Philadelphia Eagles moniker. This was described at the time as "one of the most unusual swaps in sports history". In fact, though the Pittsburgh team played as the Steelers, they operated under the name the "Philadelphia Eagles Football Club, Inc." until 1945. Bell was named the Steelers head coach and Rooney became the general manager, with 10-year contracts worth $7,500 per year.

Aftermath
Because the entire strange turn of events all took place during the offseason and the Eagles and Steelers never actually missed games in Philadelphia and Pittsburgh, respectively, the NFL considers each franchise as single unbroken entities since 1933. The transaction, which amounted in the end to Bell selling the Eagles and purchasing half-interest in the Steelers, as well as trading more than half of each team's rosters to each other, has been termed the "Pennsylvania Polka".

Both teams continued to struggle in 1941, with the Eagles going 2–8–1 and the Steelers going 1–9–1. However, the Steelers posted their first winning record in 1942 (7–4), while the Eagles finished 2–9. In 1943, when manpower shortages stemming from World War II made it impossible to fill the roster, the two teams temporarily merged to form a team popularly known as the "Steagles."  The merger, never intended as a permanent arrangement, was dissolved at the end of the 1943 season.  The Steagles posted a 5–4–1 record, giving the Eagles their first winning record as a franchise and continuing the Steelers' streak.  The Steelers had to combine with the Chicago Cardinals in 1944 to form "Card-Pitt"; the merged team lost all ten of their games that season.  The Eagles went to three NFL Championship games under Neale, losing in 1947, and winning in 1948 and 1949.  The Steelers did not win their first league title until Super Bowl IX in 1974.

After the 1949 season, Thompson sold the Eagles to a syndicate of 100 buyers, known as the "Happy Hundred", each of whom paid a fee of $3,000 for their share of the team. The Rooney family has remained the owners of the Steelers since its founding in 1933, with Art's son, Dan, taking over the team following his death in 1988.

Personnel involved

Footnotes
 Bell was the Steelers' head coach for the first two games of the 1941 season before Rooney told him to resign. Aldo Donelli, the football coach at Duquesne University coached the remainder of the season. Because he was still coaching at Duquesne, Kiesling filled in as Steelers coach when there were scheduling conflicts.
 Neale was the backs coach at Yale from 1934–1940.
 McDonough, Niccolai, and Woudenberg were later traded back to the Steelers for the 1941 season.

References

Bibliography
 
 
 
 
 

Philadelphia Eagles
Pittsburgh Steelers
1940 in Pennsylvania
1941 in Pennsylvania